Milk thief may refer to:

 The Milk Thief, a 1998 book of poetry by Paul Henry
 Tilberi (AKA snakkur), a witches' familiar and milk thief in Icelandic folklore
 Troll cat (AKA milk rabbit, troll ball), a witches' familiar and milk thief in Scandinavian folklore

See also
 Catching the Milk Thief, an 1899 film by Bamforth & Co Ltd